Dr.  H. Adhyaksa Dault, S.H., M.Si.  (born 7 June 1963) was the State Minister of Youth for Sports in the United Indonesia Cabinet (2004–2009) of Mandarese descent from Gorontalo.  He is also the youngest minister in the clock cabinet which was first announced.

The father of Umar Adiputra Adhyaksa and Fakhira Putri Maryam Adhyaksa is known to be active in organizing. From 1987 to 1988, he was trusted to be the Chair of the USAKTI Law Faculty Student Senate and in the same year he was entrusted to become the Chair of the Jakarta Regional Corruption Student Senate (ISMAHI) Association. The position of Chair of the Indonesian Institute of Justice and Democracy (LPKDI) was entrusted to him from 1999 to 2002. Likewise, as Chairman of the Indonesian Legal Counseling Association (IPHI) Jakarta he was entrusted from 1999 to 2004. Later he was also trusted to be the General Chair of the National Committee Indonesian Youth (KNP DPP) from 1999 to 2002. Then became General Chair of the Indonesian Youth Assembly (MPI) from 2003 to 2006. In addition, he was also trusted as Chairman of the YPI Al Azhar Supervisory Board for the period 2007-2012.

On August 27, 2009, Adhyaksa Dault, who was then a member of the House of Representatives from the Prosperous Justice Party who was confirmed elected from the electoral district Central Sulawesi, went to the office General Election Commission to submit a resignation as a prospective legislator.

After completing his duties as Minister of Youth and Sports Kabnet United Indonesia Volume 1 period 2004 - 2009, Adhyaksa Dault devoted himself back to the world of education by returning to teaching as a Doctor of Coastal Resource Management Doctoral Program-Diponegoro University and becoming a Candidate Professor at the Faculty of Marine Sciences and Fisheries of Diponegoro University. In addition to teaching, the assignment carried out by Adhyaksa Dault became an Independent Commissioner of PT.BRI, Tbk, since 2010 until now. On the sidelines of his busy life, Adhyaksa Dault was also active as Chairperson of VANAPRASTHA, a forum for Open Nature Activists and Environmental Activists which was established in 1976. And one of the programs is Adhyaksa Dault's creative idea as an outdoor activist and environmental activist where until now the program is still in progress is PIP3D (Promotion of Indonesia at - At the World Peak). This program combines various types of activities such as Climbing Expeditions, Touring Bicycles, Talkshows and Interactive Dialogue while promoting Indonesian tourism abroad. In 2011 Adhyaksa Dault and his team succeeded in carrying out Climbing Expeditions in Mount Blanc - France, touring bikes around parts of Western Europe and conducting interactive talk shows and dialogues in 2 European countries, France and the Netherlands.

Scouting 
On December 5, 2013, Adhyaksa Dault won the election chairman of Kwarnas Gerakan Pramuka Indonesia (Indonesian Scouting Movement National Quarter) for the 2013-2018 period at the National Conference (MUNAS) in Kupang, East Nusa Tenggara (NTT) replacing the late Azrul Azwar. Adhyaksa obtained 17 votes out of a total of 34 votes contested, narrowly won by the Deputy Chairperson of the Education and Training Center and Lecturer at the National Defense Institute, Jana T. Anggadireja. While the other candidates, former Deputy Chief of Police, Nanan Soekarna, received 1 vote and the former Secretary General of the Ministry of Defense who was also Vice President of Kwarnas, Marsdya Eris Herhanto received 1 vote. The other two candidates were Governor of South Sulawesi, Syahrul Yasin Limpo, and Former Deputy Governor of West Java, Dede Yusuf resigning from the nomination.

References

1963 births
Government ministers of Indonesia
Indonesian Muslims
Living people
University of Indonesia alumni
Bogor Agricultural University alumni
Trisakti University alumni
Prosperous Justice Party politicians
Great Indonesia Movement Party politicians
People from Donggala Regency